The Weir River is a river in the Hudson Bay drainage basin in census division 23 in Northern Manitoba, Canada.

The eponymous settlement of Weir River with its Weir River railway station is located on the river at the point where it is crossed by the Hudson Bay Railway. The station is served by the Via Rail Winnipeg–Churchill train.

See also
List of rivers of Manitoba

References

Rivers of Northern Manitoba
Tributaries of Hudson Bay